Chasing Fortune is a 1930 German drama film directed by Rochus Gliese and starring Catherine Hessling, Alexander Murski and Amy Wells. The film's art direction was by Gliese himself along with Arno Richter. It was initially made as a silent film, but was released with an added synchronised soundtrack. It was filmed at the Grunewald Studios in Berlin and on location around La Ciotat in Southern France. The animator Lotte Reiniger assistant directed the film, overseeing the shadow puppet segments.

Cast
 Catherine Hessling as Catherine
 Alexander Murski as Marquant
 Amy Wells as Jeanne, Marquants Tochter
 Berthold Bartosch as Mario
 Jean Renoir
 Lionel Royce
 Hilde Körber
 Hans Rehmann

References

Bibliography
 Grange, William. Cultural Chronicle of the Weimar Republic. Scarecrow Press, 2008.

External links

1930 films
Films of the Weimar Republic
1930 drama films
German drama films
1930s German-language films
Films directed by Rochus Gliese
Transitional sound drama films
German black-and-white films
1930s German films
Films shot in France